Almost Angels (also known in some foreign markets as Born to Sing) is a 1962 American comedy-drama film about a group of boys in the Vienna Boys' Choir. The film centers around the chorister's recruitment process, the rehearsals and the life in the institution as well. The story also conveys the value of friendship, honesty and loyalty. The child actors were actual members of the Vienna Boys Choir who perform several traditional Austrian songs throughout the motion picture. The filming took place in the Augarten Palais, the surroundings of Vienna and some other places of the beautiful Austrian landscape.

In the United States, the film was released as the second half of a double bill. The first feature on the double bill was the 1962 re-release of Lady and the Tramp.

Plot
Tony Fiala (played by Vincent Winter) is a working-class boy whose greatest desire is to become a member of Vienna's most famous choir. His father, however, wants his son to follow in his own footsteps as an engine driver. Unlike his loving and supportive mother, he sees no future for the boy in music.

Despite the objections, Tony manages to join the Vienna Boys' Choir. Once there, he meets Peter (played by Sean Scully), who is the leading chorister and the most experienced solo voice. When Peter finds out that Tony has a wonderful, clear treble voice, he feels threatened by the talented new boy. Peter's jealousy will prompt him to do everything in his power to ruin his rival's public performances and his good image as a boarder, to the point of endangering Tony's life. The sabotage will eventually end but the breaking of Peter's voice will change the events drastically.

Cast
 Vincent Winter as Tony Fiala
 Sean Scully as Peter Schaefer
 Peter Weck as Max Heller
 Hans Holt as Director Eisinger
 Bruni Löbel as Frau Fiala
 Fritz Eckhardt as Herr Fiala
 Denis Gilmore as Friedel Schmidt
 Hennie Scott as Ferdie
 Gunther Philipp as Radio Announcer
 Hans Christian as Choirmaster
 Hermann Furthmosek as Choirmaster
 Walter Regelsberger as Choirmaster

Songs and music
The film takes advantage of the story itself to present traditional Austrian and German songs performed by the children. Besides the Lieder, there are some international scores and instrumental music:

 "Kaiser-Walzer" (Emperor Waltz by Johann Strauss Jr.)
 "Willkommen"
 "Heidenröslein" (Little Rose of the Heath) by Heinrich Werner / Johann Wolfgang von Goethe
 Unidentified piece for piano and oboe by Wolfgang Amadeus Mozart
 "Der Kuckuck"
 "Wohlan, die Zeit ist kommen" from Ludwig Schubart
 "Der Lindenbaum" (Am Brunnen vor dem Tore) by Franz Schubert / Wilhelm Müller
 "Kindersinfonie" (Toy Symphony by Leopold Mozart)
 "Tra la la, der Post ist da" (The Postman) by Rudolf Löwenstein
 "Omnes de Saba Venient" (Graduale by Joseph Eybler)
 "Lustig ist das Zigeunerleben"
 "Das Hennlein Weiss"
 "Guten Abend, Gute Nacht" (Good Evening, Good Night) by Johannes Brahms
 "Greensleeves" (Traditional English Song)
 "Ländler"
 "An Der Schönen Blauen Donau" (Blue Danube Waltz by Johann Strauss Jr.)

Home media
The film was released on DVD as part of the Disney Movie Club. In addition, the title was also made available for streaming in the digital format.

Popular culture
Produced and released more than two years before The Sound of Music and six years after Sissi - The Young Empress, Almost Angels uses the same formula of combining a family story, beautiful scenery, beloved music and Austrian local customs and traditions. Although it had limited distribution in theatres, the movie aroused the interest in choral institutions and in the Vienna Boys' Choir itself. Almost Angels was telecast broken up into two parts on the Disney anthology television series.

References

External links
 
 
 
 Almost Angels film fan review website

1962 films
American comedy films
1960s English-language films
1962 comedy films
Films about classical music and musicians
Walt Disney Pictures films
Films produced by Walt Disney
Films set in Vienna
Films set in schools
1960s American films